The Syracuse and Onondaga Railway, a horse-drawn city railway, was chartered on April 29, 1863, and opened on July 25, 1864, in Syracuse, New York. The line commenced in Downtown Syracuse at Washington Street and terminated at Oakwood Cemetery at Brighton Avenue where it connected with the Onondaga Valley Railroad.

In late 1890, the company merged with People's Railroad and ceased to exist.

References

Defunct railroads in Syracuse, New York
Defunct New York (state) railroads
Railway companies established in 1863
Railway companies disestablished in 1890
Interurban railways in New York (state)